Mirocossus sombo is a moth in the family Cossidae. It was described by Yakovlev in 2011. It is found in Angola.

References

Natural History Museum Lepidoptera generic names catalog

Cossinae
Moths described in 2011